"Sure Gonna Miss Her" is a song written by Bobby Russell and was recorded by Gary Lewis & the Playboys. The song reached #9 on The Billboard Hot 100 in 1966.

The song was first recorded with prominent guitar and drums, but was rejected.  It was re-recorded with added horns and became the hit single version which was featured on mono copies of the Hits Again! and Golden Greats albums.  However, their stereo counterparts feature the original version without the horns.

Gary Lewis told interviewer Ray Shasho in 2013 that "You know what's funny though, the largest selling internet tune of mine is "Sure Gonna Miss Her," even above "This Diamond Ring" and "She's Just My Style." It's the biggest selling record of mine on the internet. It's a great song, but I would never figure that one above the others."

Personnel

According to the AFM contract sheet, the following musicians played on the tracks.

Stereo album version (recorded on August 20, 1965)

Leon Russell - session leader
Snuff Garrett
Gary Lewis
Carl Radle
David Walker
Tommy Tripplehorn

Mono single and album version (recorded on October 13, 1965)

Leon Russell - session leader
Snuff Garrett
Gary Lewis
John R. West
Carl Radle
Tommy Tripplehorn
Jim Keltner
Henry Lewy

References

1966 singles
1966 songs
Liberty Records singles
Songs written by Bobby Russell
Gary Lewis & the Playboys songs